Prawn is an American indie rock band from Ridgewood, New Jersey.

History
Prawn was formed in 2007. In 2011, Prawn self-released their first full-length album, You Can Just Leave It All, in 2011. The band followed up this release with their first EP titled Ships. In 2014, Prawn released their second full-length album, Kingfisher, in 2014. Later in 2014, Prawn's label Topshelf Records, alongside Count Your Lucky Stars Records, released a four way split with Prawn, Kittyhawk, Frameworks, and Droughts. In 2015, Prawn released a split with Moving Mountains. Prawn's latest album, Run, was released in 2017.

Band members
Tony Clark - vocals/guitar
Jamie Houghton - drums
Kyle Burns - guitar/vocals
Ryan McKenna - bass guitar/guitar/vocals
Scott Carr - bass guitar/vocals
Corey Davis - bass guitar

Discography
Studio albums
You Can Just Leave It All (2012)
Kingfisher (2014)
Run (2017)
EPs
Ships (2012)
Settled (2014)
Splits
Droughts, Frameworks, Kittyhawk, Prawn (2014)
Joie De Vivre / Prawn
Moving Mountains / Prawn - Split (2015)

References

Musical groups from New Jersey
Musical groups established in 2008
Topshelf Records artists
Count Your Lucky Stars Records artists